The Rampart Range is a mountain range in Douglas, El Paso, and Teller counties, Colorado. It is part of the Front Range of the Rocky Mountains.  The range is almost entirely public land within the Pike National Forest.

Devils Head, the highest peak in the range, reaches 9,632 ft. (2936m). It is located at N 39.260268 and W −105.1011. It is used for recreational purposes.

References

Ranges of the Rocky Mountains
Mountain ranges of Colorado
Landforms of El Paso County, Colorado
Landforms of Douglas County, Colorado
Landforms of Teller County, Colorado
Pike National Forest